The knob mudalia, scientific name Leptoxis minor, is a species of freshwater snail with a gill and an operculum, an aquatic gastropod mollusk in the family Pleuroceridae.

This species is endemic to the United States.

References

Molluscs of the United States
Leptoxis
Gastropods described in 1912
Taxonomy articles created by Polbot